The Alfred-Stock Memorial Prize  or Alfred-Stock-Gedächtnispreis is an award for "an outstanding independent scientific experimental investigation in the field of inorganic chemistry." It is awarded biennially (originally annually) by the German Chemical Society (Gesellschaft Deutscher Chemiker).  The award, consisting of a gold medal and money, was created in 1950 in recognition of the pioneering achievements in inorganic chemistry by the German chemist Alfred Stock.

Recipients 
Source: Gesellschaft Deutscher Chemiker

See also
 List of chemistry awards

References

Chemistry awards
German awards
Awards established in 1950
1950 establishments in West Germany